Eslamabad Gamasyab may refer to:

Eslamabad Gamasyab Olya
Eslamabad Gamasyab Sofla